All Saints Church is an Episcopal church located in Pasadena, California and part of the Episcopal Diocese of Los Angeles. The current building is the third home for activities of this church.

The church has a reputation of being one of Southern California's most liberal churches and one of the largest Episcopal churches in the country. Former Rector Ed Bacon said that political activism "is in the DNA of the church."

In 1980, All Saints was listed by the National Park Service on the National Register of Historic Places as a Contributing Structure to the Pasadena Civic Center District.

History of the parish 

In November 1882, eleven people gathered in the home of Mr. and Mrs. C.C. Brown for services conducted by the Reverend Trew. In 1885 the congregation dedicated its first church building at the corner of Colorado Blvd. and Garfield Ave. on April 5 (Easter Day). The parish continued to grow rapidly, and a new site was purchased at 132 North Euclid for the building of a 600-seat church. First services were held Easter Day, April 21, 1889. The congregation outgrew the church building, and a new church building was built in 1923. It was designed by architects Roland Coate (1890–1958), Reginald Davis Johnson (1882–1952) and Gordon Kaufmann (1888–1949), and it is listed on the National Register of Historic Places. It opened in 1924.

All Saints bought additional property in 1926–7, where it built a parish hall and rectory. The architects for these buildings were Cyril Bennett and Fitch Harrison Haskell, designers of the Civic Auditorium. They were also designed in the English Gothic style, and form an integrated courtyard with the main church. The Parish Hall suffered extensive damage during two fires in 1976.

A series of long rectorships began with the arrival of the Reverend Leslie E. Learned in 1908:
 The Reverend Leslie E. Learned (1908–1936)
 The Reverend John Frank Scott (1936–1957)
 The Reverend John Harris Burt (1957–1967)
 The Reverend Dr. George Frank Regas (1967–1995)
 The Reverend Dr. J. Edwin (Ed) Bacon (1995–2016)
 The Reverend Michael Kinman (2016–Present)

All Saints leaders and parishioners agreed that the church needed to add to its building space to house the increased scope of its activities. Having grown to 3,500 members in the congregation, 125 ministries and 13,000 per year, the facilities built in the 1920s were inadequate for the 21st Century. In 1999, the church hired architect Michael Palladino to design a suitable space. He developed a four-building complex employing a contemporary design, but using many of the same architectural materials as the existing complex. The proposal was presented to the Pasadena planning commission in 2007, and was estimated to cost $46.0 million. In 2008, the commission ruled that the proposed project could not proceed until a new full environmental impact report (EIR) could be produced and approved. The draft report was issued in July, 2010.

Public criticism of the proposal continue all the while, and it took five years to get the necessary approvals from the city. Meanwhile, estimated construction costs escalated dramatically because of revisions, legal fees and preparation of the EIR. According to the chairman of the building committee, the 2015 cost to complete the project would be over $70.0 million. During this time several large donors had either died or moved away from Pasadena. Furthermore, Ed Bacon was scheduled to retire from the church in May 2016. Therefore, Bacon announced that he was putting execution of the project on hold until his replacement could restart it.

History of social activism 

Although a casual look at the chronology listed below might suggest that All Saints began to be serious about social activism only began in the mid-1960s, Rector George Regas clarified this point in a 1990 interview. Regas stated that his predecessor, John Burt was a very strong advocate for social activism. Regas claimed that no (mainline) churches were even talking about such issues as racial justice in the early 1960s. Regas compared Burt to a biblical prophet calling the faithful to be aware of their own shortcomings and urging them to get busy in their own house and communities to remedy these social ills.

All Saints' long history of taking stands on social justice issues is reflected in the church's Inclusion Chronology which includes:
 1942 – Rector Frank Scott stands "in front of trains to protest the removal of Japanese Americans to internment camps during World War II"
 1964 – Rector John Burt joins with Martin Luther King, Jr., to speak for racial justice in Los Angeles
 1971 – Rector George Regas preaches anti-Vietnam War sermon, "Mr. President, The Jury is In"
 1983 – All Saints declares itself to be a "sanctuary church," offering services to refugees fleeing conflicts in Central America
 1987 – All Saints' AIDS Service Center created
 1988 – Rector George Regas preaches "Abortion: The Courts, The Church, The Conscience," in response to the Planned Parenthood v. Casey decision.
 1989 – All Saints' Vestry adopted its pro-choice position statement and would later reaffirm it in 2004
 1990 – Regas preaches "God, Sex and Justice" sermon on homosexuality
 1992 – First same-sex union blessing, of Mark Benson and Philip Straw, performed on January 18
 1999 – New Vision Partners founded to advance a peace and justice agenda from an interfaith basis
 2004 – Regas preaches "If Jesus Debated Senator Kerry and President Bush" on October 31
 2006 – All Saints fights IRS threat to remove All Saints Church's tax exempt status over the 2004 Regas sermon
 2007 – IRS drops anti-war sermon investigation
 2008 – Mel White and Gary Nixon become first same-sex couple married at All Saints Church in response to a ruling by the Supreme Court of California
 2008 – Following the passage of California Proposition 8, the All Saints Vestry passes a resolution supporting their clergy in declining to act as agents of the state in marriage while the state discriminates against same-sex couples
 2008 – Conflict arises within congregation when All Saints hosts pro-Palestinian Sabeel Conference. This also strains relations between All Saints and many Jewish friends in the Los Angeles area
 2009 – Appearing on The Oprah Winfrey Show, Bacon's January 7 statement that "being gay is a gift from God" creates controversy and led to a national discussion on his remarks
 2009 – Bacon joins with interfaith witnesses at the White House as part of the National Religious Campaign Against Torture

IRS investigation 

On the Sunday before the 2004 Presidential election, Rector Emeritus George Regas preached a sermon opposing the Iraq War. The premise of the sermon was a debate between George W. Bush and John Kerry moderated by Jesus Christ. In the sermon Regas supposed that, "Jesus [would say], 'Mr. President, your doctrine of preemptive war is a failed doctrine. Forcibly changing the regime of an enemy that posed no imminent threat has led to disaster.'"

Complaints about the sermon led to an investigation by the Internal Revenue Service (IRS) into whether the sermon voided the church's tax-exempt status as a prohibited political endorsement. The church responded by claiming that the IRS is selectively enforcing the rule by not pursuing actions against conservative churches. In response to the investigation, Rector Ed Bacon gave a sermon called, "Neighbor Love is Never Neutral."

In September 2006, the IRS issued a summons against All Saints demanding that the church turn over documents related to the controversial sermon. All Saints Church's response was that the IRS was violating the church's First Amendment rights and that the Church would challenge the IRS's actions in a summons enforcement proceeding in the United States Federal District Court. The church then established a charitable fund to raise money for its legal defense.

The Pasadena Star News reported that All Saints would remain defiant against the IRS. Rector Ed Bacon asserted that political activism was "in the DNA" of the church.

Result of IRS investigation

On September 25, 2007, CCH reported in Federal Tax Day:

According to the Pasadena Star News, the IRS told church officials that the sermon constituted an endorsement of a candidate. Rector Ed Bacon demanded that the IRS apologize and that the IRS be investigated.

The Rev. Ed Bacon stated:

The Church's legal counsel has asked the IRS for a clarification of the decision, and for assurance that the IRS did not act under pressure from the White House. The Church has also requested that the U.S. Treasury Inspector General for Tax Administration (TIGTA) examine the IRS's investigation.

Sabeel controversy 
In 2008, relations with the local Jewish community were strained when the Church hosted the pro-Palestinian Sabeel conference. Rabbi emeritus of the Pasadena Jewish Temple and Center, Rabbi Gil Kollin, said: "As a neighbor, I was disappointed. A conference of this kind is going to make me feel uncomfortable and get a lot of our congregants upset." The local Jewish temple had previously supported the church in its IRS dispute.

See also 

 Pasadena Civic Center District

References 
Notes

Citations

External links 
 

Episcopal church buildings in California
Churches in Pasadena, California
Gothic Revival church buildings in California
Religious organizations established in 1882
1882 establishments in California
Churches completed in 1923
Historic district contributing properties in California